

Boylan Heights is a historic neighborhood in Raleigh, North Carolina. It was added to the National Register of Historic Places as a historic district on July 29, 1985.  It is also one of six local Historic Overlay Districts in Raleigh.

Boylan Heights has been explored in the book Everything Sings: Maps for a Narrative Atlas by resident and critical cartographer Denis Wood, which maps the neighborhood in unusual ways. In the introduction to the book, Wood writes that these maps explore "other ways of thinking about [Boylan Heights] . . . as some sort of community, or as a marriage of community and place, or as those people in that place, their relationships, and their ways in the world . . . a life process." Maps include the location of jack-o'-lanterns on porches, radio waves permeating the air, the light from street lamps, and other attributes of Boylan Heights that cannot be mapped in a traditional way.

The national historic district encompasses 252 contributing buildings and was developed between about 1907 and 1935.  It includes notable examples of Queen Anne, Colonial Revival, and Bungalow / American Craftsman style architecture.

Its name was used for the 1987 album Boylan Heights by The Connells. There is a restaurant named after the district in The Corner neighborhood of Charlottesville, Virginia.

Notable structures
Montfort Hall, built for William Montfort Boylan in 1858

Notable residents
Denis Wood, widely reviewed former NCSU professor of Design
Charles Meeker, former mayor of Raleigh, NC
Deborah K. Ross, Representative for North Carolina's 2nd congressional district, formerly served in the NC General Assembly and as director of the ACLU of NC

See also
 List of Registered Historic Places in North Carolina

References

External links
 Boylan Heights neighborhood web page
 Travel itinerary page at NPS.gov
 National Register Historic Districts in Raleigh, North Carolina, RHDC
 Boylan Heights Historic Overlay District, RHDC

Historic districts on the National Register of Historic Places in North Carolina
Queen Anne architecture in North Carolina
Colonial Revival architecture in North Carolina
Neighborhoods in Raleigh, North Carolina
Boylan family residences
National Register of Historic Places in Raleigh, North Carolina